Carlo Scarascia-Mugnozza (19 April 1920 – 13 May 2004) was an Italian politician.

Coming from a Catholic family, he joined the Christian Democracy at a very young age. He was a member of the Chamber of Deputies from 1953 to 1972. Between February 1962 and December 1963 he was Undersecretary for public education in the Fanfani IV government and Undersecretary for justice in the Leone I government.

He was a Member of the European Parliament from 1961 to 1972 and chaired its energy committee, research committee and parliamentary political committee.

He served as a European Commissioner from 1972 to 1977: as Commissioner for Agriculture in the Mansholt Commission, and then as Commissioner Parliamentary Affairs, Environmental Policy, Transport in the Ortoli Commission.

References 

1920 births
2004 deaths
Christian Democracy (Italy) politicians
Members of the Chamber of Deputies (Italy)
Italian European Commissioners
European Commissioners 1972–1973
European Commissioners 1973–1977